Halbendorfer See is a lake in Saxony, Germany. Its surface area is ca. 80 ha.

Lakes of Saxony